Elizabeth H. Filippouli is a London-based journalist, writer and social entrepreneur.

Early life
Elizabeth was born and raised in Athens, Greece. She is the daughter of the journalist, author, and playwright Stamatios-Alexandros Filippoulis (Σταμάτης Φιλιππούλης) and antiques dealer Ελένη Φιλιππούλη. Her uncle on her father’s side was the Greek publisher (:el: Αλέκος Φιλιππὀπουλος) and her great-great aunt was Μαρίκα Μπότση the first woman who was elected mayor in Greece. She grew up in the worlds of journalism, publishing, performing arts, surrounded by journalists, writers, poets and actors. She was married to Greek Conservative MP and author Γιάννης Γιαννέλης.

Career
Filippouli studied German Literature at the University of Athens. She acquired her master's degree on Transnational Media and Globalisation in 2010 from City University in London, followed by the MBA-level Diploma on Strategy and Innovation at Oxford University’s Said Business School and pursued Creative Writing at Harvard. During her career as a journalist she specialized on international affairs and worked for broadsheet papers, the Athens 9.84 Radio and the Hellenic Broadcasting Corporation in Greece as presenter and editor in chief of current affairs programmes. She joined CNN International as World Report contributor in 2000 and Al Jazeera English as presenter and documentary producer in 2005. She worked as main news presenter, broadsheet paper columnist and investigative reporter. 
For Al Jazeera English she produced the documentaries: Greekgate, Italygate, A King Without a Country. 
She has interviewed leading figures such as: Ted Turner, James Rubin, Deepak Chopra, Mohamed El Baradei, Santiago Calatrava, Enrique Oltuski, Alberto Juantorena, Chris Cramer, Al Gore, Susan Sarandon, Lord Robertson, Christiane Amanpour, Peter Arnett, King Constantine of Greece, Lord Coe.

In 2009, Filippouli transitioned to social entrepreneurship launching an online business network, Globeez, to help connect professionals and entrepreneurs from the emerging markets. In 2011 she launched Global Thinkers Forum a non-profit organisation in the space of values-based leadership, organising conversations and hosting mentoring programmes for women and youth.

Global collaboration
The inaugural Global Thinkers Forum took place in 2012 under the patronage of Queen Rania Al Abdullah convening 300 leaders, innovators, social entrepreneurs, investors and academics.  In 2012 Global Thinkers Forum launched the 'Global Thinkers Forum Awards for Excellence', recognising the work of values-driven pioneers. Among the recipients have been Zaha Hadid, Sir David Frost, Arianna Huffington, Tobias Ellwood, Elif Shafak, Sheikha Lubna Al Qasimi, Professor Tu Weiming, Professionals for Humanity, Marianna V. Vardinoyannis, International Red Cross. The Global Thinkers Forum Advisory Board has been supported by thought leaders such as John Alderdice, Princess Sumaya bint El Hassan, Ellen Johnson-Sirleaf, Muna AbuSulayman, Prince Pavlos of Greece, Elif Shafak, Femi Oke. Filippouli is an advocate of values-driven thinking and collaboration, being vocal about 'The imminent need for our societies to build on a long-term vision and to prioritise 'we' instead of 'I'". She has publicly expressed her criticism about Angela Merkel's leadership as "creating cracks in the European Union community, with Germany's superpower role generating inequality and polarization within the EU"

Mentoring programs
In 2015 Filippouli launched the mentoring programs, 'Telemachus' and 'Athena' as a tribute to her mentor CNN executive Maggie Eales, who died that year. They are nonprofit and support aspiring social impact leaders by pairing them with seasoned professionals. The programs have supported 350 individuals in 75 countries and contribute towards the 17 UN Sustainable Development Goals.

Athena40 global conversation
Athena40 was launched at UNESCO on International Women’s Day, 8 March 2018, to advance the role of women and support the UN Global Goals. Athena40 hosts a 'Global Conversation' organising panels in cities around the world, centrally moderated by BBC Presenter Tim Willcox. Filippouli has commented that "we cannot ignore the fact that women have been affected disproportionately and in multiple ways".

From women to the world
Filippouli is the editor of 'From Women to the World-Letters for a New Century' published by Bloomsbury/IB Tauris in July 2021.  Bringing together contributions from a global group of women – politicians, royalty, actors, writers, activists- the collection features Booker-prize nominated Elif Shafak writing a letter to Jacinda Ardern, Prime Minister of New Zealand, activist and TV presenter June Sarpong OBE addressing designer Diane Von Furstenberg, Her Royal Highness Princess Sumaya bint El Hassan of Jordan, activist, journalist Mariane Pearl to the anonymous woman, and entrepreneur Annabel Karmel MBE to her daughter Laura. Each is based on these women’s personal histories and experiences, drawing attention to social issues such as gender equality, homelessness, war, LGBTQ activism, mental health, COVID-19, the refugee crisis. The book received praise in the international press, Vanity Fair, The Independent, The New Arab and it was featured at the Hay Festival in May 2021 with letters from the book read by actresses Kate Winslet, Juliet Stephenson, Suzanne Packer, Vanessa Redgrave, Louise Brealey.

Other published work
In 2020 Filippouli co-authored with Dr Marc J. Ventresca of Said Business School a work on ‘Kindness in Leadership in Times of Crisis’, proposing ways to rethink the work of leaders in a post-pandemic world prioritising empathy and emotional intelligence.
In 2004 an anthology of her opinion editorials was published in Greece by Ελεύθερα Γράμματα, under the title 'Η Αόρατη Πραγματικότητα᾽ (The Invisible Reality).

TedX Talks
Filippouli gave a TedX talk in 2017 at Stormont in Northern Ireland where she talked about the eternal clash between emotion and reason and said that Ancient Greeks used the word ‘nous’ to define the connection between heart and mind and the importance to listen to both.  “We say that women are guided by emotion while men by reason. Is it a clash of minds, or mindsets? Could it be a clash of systems too? Humanism vs. Capitalism? This world would be a better place if we allowed the 'Nous' (Greek for 'common sense') to become a bridge between emotion and reason”.
In 2013 she gave a TedX talk at TedXSabanci in Istanbul.

Other Affiliations
Filippouli has served on the Global Advisory Board of the Prince's Trust International, the International News Safety Institute, NewsXchange and the British Chamber of Commerce in Greece as vice president.

References

External links 

 ESI Celebrates International Women's Day 2019 with Global Thinkers Forum and Athena40
 Inside the International Women's Day forum attended by Princess Eugenie 
 Gender equality by 2030, Secretary-General tells top women
 Sharjah’s NAMA partners with Global Thinkers Forum
 Στην Ελλάδα Εχουν Εκλείψει Οι Πολιτικοί Ηγέτες
 Articles at the Huffington Post by Filippouli
 The Global Thinkers Forum – a global force to be reckoned with in Leadership
 Filippouli on the Future of Innovation in Media, NewsXchange 
 Filippouli launches in Jordan an international think tank
 Al Jazeera International Reveals More On-Screen Talent 
 Crossroads Europe, Al Jazeera 
 Italygate on Al Jazeera English
 Greekgate on Al Jazeera English 
 A King Without A Country on Al Jazeera English
 Elizabeth Filippouli chairs the INSI debate in Athens
 The Invisible Reality by Elizabeth Filippouli
 Τα Χρώματα της Ιριδας
 Ελισάβετ Φιλιππούλη: Ας βάλουμε τα δυνατά μας για την Ολυμπιάδα
 Δημοπρασία Αλληλεγγύης για τα Θύματα του Τσουνάμι
 Filippouli hosts the Eurovision (2005)
 New Media Landscape, Less Media Safety (Rees, G., 2010)

1974 births
Living people
Mass media people from Athens
Businesspeople from Athens
Greek expatriates in the United Kingdom
Greek television journalists
Alumni of Saïd Business School